Oleksandr Shchanov (13 July 1924 – 6 November 2009) was a Ukrainian football defender, forward, and manager. He was also a World War II veteran who fought in the Eastern Front.

Player career
Shchanov played in local Osnova Ivanovo since his childhood. Shchanov played for FC Dynamo Kyiv. Due to a knee injury in 1952, he was forced to end his playing career.

Coaching career
At the beginning of his coaching career, Shchanov trained young players in Dynamo Kyiv. From 1954 to 1955, he trained youth in FShM Kyiv (The Football School Youth). In May 1955, he returned to Dynamo Kyiv, where he worked as a manager of the team. In September 1955, he was invited to lead FC Spartak Stanislav, and by managing this team, he became the champion of the Ukrainian SSR in 1955. He worked with a number of football clubs, including FC Temp Kyiv, FC Avangard Chernihiv, FC Avangard Kharkiv, and FC SKA Kyiv.

Personal life

In addition to participating in football, Shchanov fought in World War II. His knee injury in 1952 prevented him from continuing his original career as a player.

On 6 November 2009, Oleksandr Ivanovych Shchanov died at the age of 86.

Honours

Player
 Soviet Top League Reserves: 1952 Champion

Coach
 Ukrainian SRR Champion: 1955

References

External links
  Profile

1924 births
2009 deaths
Russian footballers
Soviet footballers
Soviet football managers
Ukrainian footballers
Ukrainian football managers
FC Dynamo Kyiv players
FC Desna Chernihiv managers
FC Spartak Ivano-Frankivsk managers
Sportspeople from Ivanovo
Association football forwards